Cleonymus or Kleonymos may refer to:
 Cleonymus of Athens (fifth century BCE) Athenian general, cited by Aristophanes for his cowardice
 Cleonymus (d. 371 BCE), son of great beauty of Sphodrias and aḯtas ("beloved") of King Archidamus III of Sparta
 Cleonymus of Sparta (c. 340–c. 272 BCE) Spartan general and member of the royal family of the Agiads
 Cleonymus of Phlius (fl. 229 BCE) tyrant of the city of Phlius who was convinced to resign his post by Aratus of Sicyon in 329 BC
 Cleonymus (wasp), an insect genus in the family Pteromalidae